The canton of Asfeld is a former French canton located in the Ardennes department in the former Champagne-Ardenne region (now part of Grand Est). This canton was organized around Asfeld in the arrondissement of Rethel.

Departmental councilors

Composition 
The canton of Asfeld grouped together eighteen municipalities and had 5,913 inhabitants (2012 census without double counts).

Aire
Asfeld
Avaux
Balham
Bergnicourt
Blanzy-la-Salonnaise
Brienne-sur-Aisne
L'Écaille
Gomont
Houdilcourt
Poilcourt-Sydney
Roizy
Saint-Germainmont
Saint-Remy-le-Petit
Sault-Saint-Remy
Le Thour
Vieux-lès-Asfeld
Villers-devant-le-Thour

References 

Asfeld
2015 disestablishments in France
States and territories disestablished in 2015